The second season of Popstar, premiered on Rede Globo on Sunday, September 16, 2018 at 1:00 p.m. / 12:00 p.m. (BRT / AMT).

Contestants

Elimination chart
Key
 – Contestant did not perform
 – Contestant was in the bottom two and relegated to elimination zone
 – Contestant received the lowest combined score and was eliminated
 – Contestant received the highest combined score
 – Contestant received the highest combined score and won immunity
 – Contestant finished as runner-up
 – Contestant finished as the winner

Week 1
Specialists

Benito di Paula
Bruno Belutti
Dado Villa-Lobos
Junior Lima
Marcos Prado
Marcelo Soares
MariMoon
Preta Gil
Tony Garrido
Vanessa da Mata

Week 2
Specialists

Artur Xexéo
Bell Marques
Daniel
Elba Ramalho
Ferrugem
Leila Pinheiro
Roberta Sá
Samuel Rosa
Sidney Magal
Vitor Kley

Week 3
Specialists

Dennis Carvalho
Elymar Santos
Iza
Margareth Menezes
Mariana Aydar
Paula Mattos
Paulo Lima
Paulo Ricardo
Projota
Xande de Pilares

Week 4
Specialists

Di Ferrero
Diogo Nogueira
Fernanda Abreu
João Augusto
Lucy Alves
Marcelo Serrado
Sandra de Sá
Simony
Xand Avião
Zeeba

Week 5
Specialists

 Baby do Brasil
 DJ Memê
 João Marcelo Bôscoli
 Luiza Possi
 Manu Gavassi
 Naiara Azevedo
 Nasi
 Péricles
 Roberto Menescal
 Tato

Round 1

Round 2

Week 6
Specialists

 Dinho Ouro Preto
 Dudu Nobre
 Luciana Mello
 Ludmilla
 Luiz Caldas
 Maria Rita
 Pedro Luís
 Thaeme Mariôto
 Thiago Bertoldo
 Tiago Leifert

Week 7
Specialists

 Dilsinho
 Ellen Oléria
 Gabriel Moura
 George Israel
 José Augusto
 Lan Lanh
 Leiloca Neves
 Paulinho Moska
 Teresa Cristina
 Wanessa Camargo

Week 8
Specialists

 Amado Batista
 Ancelmo Gois
 Davi Moraes
 Fafá de Belém
 Gaby Amarantos
 Gustavo Mioto
 Joelma
 Luísa Sonza
 Paulo Miklos
 Zizi Possi

Round 1

Round 2

Week 9
Specialists

 Angélica
 Flávio Venturini
 Frederico Nunes
 Joao Neto Nunes
 Karol Conká
 Latino
 Marcelo Soares
 Patricia Marx
 Sarah Oliveira
 Saulo Fernandes

Round 1

Round 2

Week 10
Specialists

 Artur Xexéo
 Bruno Belutti
 Di Ferrero
 Fafá de Belém
 Manu Gavassi
 Marcos Prado
 Naiara Azevedo
 Preta Gil
 Sandra de Sá
 Toni Garrido

Round 1

Round 2

Round 3

Ratings and reception

Brazilian ratings
All numbers are in points and provided by Kantar Ibope Media.

 In 2018, each point represents 248.647 households in 15 market cities in Brazil (71.855 households in São Paulo)

References

External links
 PopStar on Gshow.com

2018 Brazilian television seasons